Sir Charles Cameron Lees  (11 March 1837 – 26 July 1898) was a British military officer and colonial administrator.

He was the son of John Campbell Lees, former Chief Justice of the Bahamas.

He was originally commissioned into the 1st West India Regiment, but transferred to the 76th Foot in 1854, was promoted Lieutenant, and transferred to the 23rd Foot as adjutant in 1858. He resigned as adjutant in 1864 and retired in 1866, becoming adjutant of the 3rd Derbyshire Rifle Volunteers later that year.

Lees was acting Governor of the Gold Coast in 1874, 1876 and 1878–79, Governor of the Bahamas from 1881 to 1884, and Governor of the Leeward Islands from 1884 to 1885. He was 16th Governor of Mauritius from 21 Dec 1889 to 12 Mar 1892 and was Governor of British Guiana from 1893 to 1895.

In 1875 he married Maria Ledwell Nugent daughter of Sir Oliver Nugent of Antigua. Lees is buried in Brompton Cemetery, London.

References

Colonial Administrative Service officers
British governors of the Bahamas
76th Regiment of Foot officers
Royal Welch Fusiliers officers
Sherwood Foresters officers
West India Regiment officers
Knights Commander of the Order of St Michael and St George
1837 births
1898 deaths
Burials at Brompton Cemetery
Governors of Barbados
Governors of the Leeward Islands
Governors of British Guiana
Governors of British Mauritius